Gribkovo is a rural locality (a village) in Kovarditskoye Rural Settlement, Muromsky District, Vladimir Oblast, Russia. The population was 61 as of 2010.

Geography 
Gribkovo is located 19 km west of Murom (the district's administrative centre) by road. Strigino is the nearest rural locality.

References 

Rural localities in Muromsky District
Melenkovsky Uyezd